Arnaldo is a given name. Notable people with the name include:

 Arnaldo Abrantes (born 1986), Portuguese track and field sprinter
 Arnaldo Alonso (born 1979), Paraguayan footballer
 Arnaldo André (born 1943), soap-opera Paraguayan actor
 Arnaldo Andreoli (1893–1952), Italian gymnast who competed in the 1920 Summer Olympics
 Arnaldo Maria Angelini (1909–1999), Italian scientist, working with Italy's power generation
 Arnaldo Antunes (born 1960), writer and composer from Brazil
 Arnaldo Baptista (born 1948), Brazilian rock musician and composer
 Arnaldo Villalba Benitez (born 1978), Paraguayan footballer
 Arnaldo Bonfanti (born 1978), footballer
 Arnaldo Carli (1901–1972), Italian racing cyclist and Olympic champion
 Arnaldo Cézar Coelho (born 1943), the first Brazilian to take charge of the FIFA World Cup final
 Arnaldo Cohen, Brazilian pianist
 Arnaldo da Silva (born 1964), former Brazilian athlete
 Arnaldo de Oliveira Sales, GBM, OBE, JP, Chairman of the Hong Kong Olympic Academy
 Arnaldo Deserti (born 1979), Italian water polo player
 Arnaldo Edi Lopes da Silva (born 1982), Portuguese footballer of Guinea-Bissauan descent
 Arnaldo Espínola (born 1975), Paraguayan footballer
 Arnaldo Faustini (1872–1944), Italian polar geographer, writer, and cartographer
 Arnaldo Ferraro (born 1936), former Republican Party politician from Brooklyn, New York
 Arnaldo Forlani (born 1925), Italian politician and 44th Prime Minister of Italy
 Arnaldo Freire, Brazilian guitarist, teacher, cultural producer and composer
Arnaldo Freitas (born 1952), Portuguese former footballer
 Mario Arnaldo Gómez (born 1981), Honduran footballer
 Arnaldo Jabor (born 1940), Brazilian film director, screenwriter and producer
 Arnaldo Ramos Lauzerique, Cuban independent economist
 Arnaldo Tamayo Méndez (born 1942), the first Cuban citizen to travel into earth orbit
 Arnaldo Mesa (born 1967), retired boxer from Cuba and Olympic silver medallist
 Arnaldo Momigliano KBE (1908–1987), Italian historian known for his work in historiography
 Arnaldo Ochoa (1930–1989), Cuban general executed after being found guilty of treason
 Arnaldo Ortelli, Swiss footballer and squad member for Switzerland in the 1934 FIFA World Cup
 Arnaldo Otegi (born 1958), Basque politician, spokesman for the outlawed Abertzale Basque separatist party Batasuna
 Arnaldo Ouana (born 1969), retired Mozambique international football player
 Arnaldo Pérez (born 1958), former butterfly and freestyle swimmer from Puerto Rico
 Arnaldo Pambianco (born 1935), Italian former professional road racing cyclist
 Arnaldo Pereira (born 1985), Paraguayan footballer
 Arnaldo Pomodoro, Italian sculptor
 Javier Arnaldo Portillo (born 1981), Honduran football player
 Arnaldo Orfila Reynal (1897–1997), Argentine chemist and academic
 Arnaldo Ribeiro (1930–2009), Roman Catholic Archbishop in Ribeirão Preto, Brazil
 Arnaldo Darío Rosado (1953–1978), activist for the independence of Puerto Rico from a very young age
 Arnaldo Salvi (born 1915), Italian professional football player
 Arnaldo Santos, Puerto Rican reggaeton and rock producer, singer and guitarist
 Arnaldo Sentimenti (1914–1997), former Italian football player and coach
 Arnaldo Silva (born 1944), former Portuguese footballer who played as midfielder
 Arnaldo Villalba (born 1978), Paraguayan footballer

See also 
 ASPIRA Raúl Arnaldo Martinez Charter School, charter school in North Miami, FL
 Estádio Olímpico Regional Arnaldo Busatto, multi-use stadium in Cascavel, Brazil

References 

Spanish masculine given names
Italian masculine given names
Portuguese masculine given names
Italian names of Germanic origin